Pierre Henri Cami (20 June 1884 – 3 November 1958) was a French humorist.

Works
 Les Amours de Mathusalem, 1925
 Vendetta ! ou Une aventure corsée. éd. E. Flammarion, Paris, 1926, 248 
 Cami-Voyageur ou Mes aventures en Amérique, coll. Les Auteurs gais, éd. E. Flammarion, Paris, 1927, 242 
 Les Mémoires de Dieu le père, 1930 
 Pssitt et Pchutt dans le cirque de la vie (entrées camiques), 1932
 L'Œuf à voiles, 1934
 Quand j'étais jeune fille…, mémoires d'un gendarme. éd. Baudinière, Paris, 1937, 320 
 Le Voyage inouï de monsieur Rikiki, 1938
 Album de Roussignoulet, impr. de Lescher-Moutoué, Pau, 1941, 16
 Les Nouveaux Paysans, 1943 (?)
 Détective à moteur : L'Énigme des cinq pavillons, 1945
 Un beau jour de printemps, 1946
 Détective à moteur (Krik-robot) : Les Kidnappés du panthéon, éd. P. Dupont, Paris, 1947
 Sans-un au purgatoire ou Après le jugement dernier, 1948
 Le Poilu aux mille trucs et autres nouvelles et drames comiques, Grande Collection nationale 66, éd. F. Rouff, Paris, 36

Novels 
 Les Amours de Mathusalem, coll. Les Auteurs gais, éd. E. Flammarion, Paris, 1925, 284
 Le Jugement dernier, roman prématuré, éd. Baudinière, Paris, 1928, 320 
 Le Scaphandrier de la Tour Eiffel, éd. Baudinière, Paris, 1929, 320
 Le Fils des Trois Mousquetaires, roman héroï-camique, éd. Baudinière, Paris, 1929, 232
 Christophe Colomb ou La Véritable Découverte de l'Amérique, roman sonore, éd. Baudinière, Paris, 1931, 288
 Les Amants de l'entre-ciel, éd. Baudinière, Paris, 1933, 351
 Les Chevaliers du gai, roman de jaquette et d'épée, éd. Baudinière, Paris, 1935, 286
 Les Nouveaux paysans, éd. Baudinière, Paris, 1943, 251 
 La Ceinture de dame Alix, roman à clé, éd. Baudinière, Paris, 1946, 224 
 Je ferai cocu le percepteur, roman fiscal et passionnel, éd. Baudinière, Paris, 1949, 253

References

 A Sampler par Cami : English translation by John Crombie (2013)

1884 births
1958 deaths
20th-century French non-fiction writers
20th-century French male writers
French humorists
People from Pau, Pyrénées-Atlantiques